PVSD may refer to:

Panther Valley School District in Carbon and Schuylkill Counties, Pennsylvania, USA
Perkiomen Valley School District in Montgomery County, Pennsylvania, USA
Pleasant Valley School District
Pleasant Valley School District (California)
Pleasant Valley School District (Pennsylvania)
Pojoaque Valley School District
Prairie Valley School Division in Regina, Saskatchewan, Canada